Pitamber Das (1905-1985) was an Indian politician. He was the President of the Bharatiya Jana Sangh.  He was a Member of Parliament, representing Uttar Pradesh in the Rajya Sabha the upper house of India's Parliament as a member of the Bharatiya Jana Sangh.

References

Rajya Sabha members from Uttar Pradesh
Bharatiya Jana Sangh politicians
1905 births
1985 deaths